The  occurred on the afternoon of Thursday, June 18, 1953 when a United States Air Force (USAF) Douglas C-124 Globemaster II aircraft crashed three minutes after takeoff from Tachikawa, Japan, killing all 129 people on board.  At the time, the crash was the deadliest in aviation history.

Aircraft and occupants

The aircraft was a USAF Douglas C-124A-DL Globemaster II of the 374th Troop Carrier Group, serial number 51-0137.  It was powered by four Pratt & Whitney R-4360-20WA engines.

The aircraft carried 122 passengers and 7 crewmembers.  Most of those aboard were airmen who were returning to their duties in South Korea after a five-day rest and recreation leave in Japan.  The commander of the aircraft, Major Herbert G. Voruz Jr., 37, had logged more than 6,000 flying hours.  The pilot, Major Robert D. McCorkle, was also an experienced aviator. Another pilot, Major Paul E. Kennedy, was on board to log additional flying time.

Accident

The aircraft departed Tachikawa Air Base for Seoul at 16:31 JST.  Just one minute into the flight, the aircraft's No. 1 (outer left) engine burst into flames.  Voruz immediately shut down the engine and radioed that he was returning to Tachikawa.  ATC asked if he wanted a ground-controlled approach (GCA), which Voruz accepted; during this, he could be heard shouting "Give me more power!  Give me more power!" to the flight engineer.  Ground control asked if he could maintain altitude; Voruz replied "Roger".  However, as the pilots prepared to return to the airfield, the left wing stalled, causing the aircraft to roll to the left and enter a shallow, but unrecoverable, dive.  In desperation, the pilots attempted to pull up, but in vain.  Ground control asked if they were declaring emergency, but received no reply.  At around 16:33, the flight disappeared from radar screens.  At 16:34, the C-124 crashed into a watermelon patch about 3.5 miles from the airbase and exploded on impact.

Sergeant Frank J. Palyn, 434th ECB, who witnessed the crash from his car, said:

The two starboard engines reportedly kept running for some time after the crash.

Emergency responses

Air base and local fire department crews were soon on the scene, followed by chaplains and identification teams.  A temporary morgue was set up as victims were retrieved from the wreckage.

Vess immediately pulled over and ran to the crash site. He pulled the aircraft's radio operator, John H. Jordan Jr., from the wreckage, but Jordan died a few minutes later. Vess then continued to help search for survivors until the aircraft's fuel tanks exploded. Also helping to pull bodies from the wreckage was American missionary Rev. Henry McCune, who lived nearby. His son Jonathan took pictures of the wreckage with his Brownie box camera. 

At 16:50, Tachikawa GCA called the 36th Air Rescue Squadron at Johnson Air Base to the crash site.  Lt. Colonel Theodore P. Tatum Jr., his co-pilot, and a two-man pararescue team arrived on the scene via helicopter at 17:13; their subsequent inspection confirmed that there were no survivors.

Aftermath

According to the accident report, the crash was caused by the pilots' improper flap usage and airspeed loss due to the failure of a port engine.

The 129-person death toll remained the highest aviation fatality count until 1960, when 134 died in the collision of a United Airlines Douglas DC-8 and a Trans World Airlines Lockheed L-1049 Super Constellation over New York City.  The Tachikawa crash remained the deadliest air disaster involving a single aircraft until an Air France Boeing 707 crashed during takeoff in 1962.

There were no fatalities among people on the ground, but one man in the watermelon patch sustained burns to his head and hands.

Local residents erected a monument memorializing victims of the tragedy. However, the monument is no longer to be found at the site, which is now a driving school.

See also
 List of aircraft accidents and incidents resulting in at least 50 fatalities

References

1953 in Japan
Aviation accidents and incidents in 1953
Accidents and incidents involving the Douglas C-124 Globemaster II
Aviation accidents and incidents in Japan
Accidents and incidents involving United States Air Force aircraft
Tachikawa, Tokyo